Shiela Makoto (born 14 January 1990) is a Zimbabwean association football defender. She is a member of the Zimbabwe women's national football team and represented the country in their Olympic debut at the 2016 Summer Olympics.

Makoto played for the  Blue Swallows Queens in 2016. She was brought up in poverty in a family of seven. She gained a career from her skill at football. She has trained in Switzerland and her education was funded by football.

References

Zimbabwe women's international footballers
Footballers at the 2016 Summer Olympics
Olympic footballers of Zimbabwe
Living people
1990 births
Zimbabwean women's footballers
Women's association football defenders